Juan Montes (born 4 June 1947) is a retired footballer who played as a midfielder for clubs in Argentina and Greece.

Club career
Born in Buenos Aires, Montes began playing football for Club Atlético Atlanta. In 1969, he moved to local rivals Club Atlético Chacarita Juniors, where he would win the 1969 Metropolitano championship.

In July 1972, Montes joined Greek second division side PAS Giannina F.C. He spent more than ten seasons with PAS Giannina, helping the club gain promotion to the Greek first division during the 1973–74 season. He left the club in December 1982, making 231 appearances and scoring 4 goals in the Greek top flight.

Honours
PAS Giannina
 Super League Greece 2: 1973-74

References

External links
 Profile at BDFA
 Profile at bluevayeros.gr

1947 births
Living people
Argentine footballers
Naturalized citizens of Greece
Club Atlético Atlanta footballers
Chacarita Juniors footballers
PAS Giannina F.C. players
Association football midfielders
Footballers from Buenos Aires